Puya venezuelana is a species in the genus Puya. This species is endemic to Venezuela.

References

venezuelana
Flora of Venezuela